Jules Engel (born Gyula Engel, March 11, 1909 – September 6, 2003) was an American filmmaker, painter, sculptor, graphic artist, set designer, animator, film director, and teacher. He was the founding director of the experimental animation program at the California Institute of the Arts, where he taught until his death, serving as mentor to several generations of animators.

Early life 
Engel was born in Budapest, Austria-Hungary, to an American mother, and immigrated to Chicago when he was thirteen years old. He lived in Oak Park, Illinois, adjacent to Chicago, and attended Evanston Township High School, where he began developing his drawing style.

At the age of 17 Engel moved to Los Angeles seeking an athletic scholarship to either USC or UCLA. He lived in Hollywood while attending the Chouinard Art Institute and started to draw for magazines. He worked in the studio of a local painter sketching landscapes, Ken Strobel. Through his relationship with Strobel, he was referred to work as a background artists and as an inbetweening animator in Mintz Studio, the studio founded by Charles Mintz and his wife Margaret J. Winkler, which later became known as Screen Gems.

Career

1938–1941: Disney period 
In 1938 the painter and art teacher Phil Dike helped him get an opportunity to work at Walt Disney Studios in Burbank.

Fantasia
At Disney Engel worked in the film Fantasia, released in 1940. At the time, Disney intended to integrate "low" art (animation) and "high" art (classical music), and the studio needed someone who was familiar with the timing of dance. Because of his drawing talent and his growing knowledge of dance, Engel was assigned to work on the choreography of the Russian sprites and Chinese mushrooms dance sequences of Tchaikovsky's Nutcracker Suite, animated by Art Babbitt. For these sequences, Engel emphasized the contrast between the bright figures and dark ground, which critics consider as an important development of modern animation away from naturalism.

Bambi
David Hand, director of Bambi, asked Engel work with him on the film. Engel did the storyboard for the sequence where Bambi first encounters the doe Faline. After completing the sequence, he did color sketches that diverged from the naturalistic color schemes being used in production.

Engel's time at Disney would come to an end with the development of the Disney animators' strike. While the union won the case over the studio, Engel didn't go back, largely because while he enjoyed the place, he felt uncomfortable being surrounded by colleagues that he felt didn't share his passion for the aesthetics of animation.

1942–1944: Motion Picture Unit 
He was an animator in the First Motion Picture Unit during World War II, alongside the likes of Ronald Reagan, and Theodor Geisel (Dr. Seuss). Originally, Engel was waiting to be drafted in the U.S. Army, but was rejected because of his poor eyesight (indicated by his glasses), and a bad shoulder. The Air Force eventually recruited Engel for the Motion Picture Unit to work on training videos and war bond advertisements, at the Hal Roach Studios in Culver City. He would eventually work on drawing aerial maps and instructions for weapons.

1944–1959: UPA days 
Engel was one of a group of animators—including John Hubley, and Herbert Klynn—who left Disney to join the United Productions of America (UPA) studio. At UPA, Engel worked as a background artist on cartoons including the Oscar-winning Gerald McBoing Boing, Madeline, and Mr. Magoo, becoming art director in 1950.

The environment at UPA was much more open to experimentation, unlike at Disney. Engel brought to UPA his distinctive use of color, influenced by abstract painting and the work of Kandinsky, Klee, Miró, Matisse, Dufy, as well of the Bauhaus book "Language of Vision". Engel would later claim responsibility for discovering the children's book Madeline, and suggesting to Stephen Bosustow to buy, copyright, and develop the series.

1959-1962: Format films 
Together with Herbert Klynn and Buddy Getzler, former colleagues from UPA, Engel founded the television animation studio Format Films. It produced episodes of popular TV series such as The Alvin Show and Popeye the Sailor. The film Icarus Montgolfier Wright, scripted by Ray Bradbury, was nominated for the Academy Award for Best Animated Short Film in 1962.

Klynn closed the studio in 1962 when Engels left for Europe, but reopened it by 1965 as Format Productions.

1962-1967: Paris
In 1962 went to Paris to direct The World of Siné, an animated cartoon of the work of Siné and which received the La Belle Qualité Award. The World of Sine was purchased and released throughout Europe by Jacques Tati. In 1964, Engel designed the set for The Little Prince, using abstract sculptural forms on stage. This was a theatre production in Paris for produced and directed by Raymond Gérôme  which combined animation by Engel with a live performance on stage. Engel was also set designer for Le Jouex, an avant garde play starring Michelle Boucett. During his stay in Paris, he was friendly with other artists, including Man Ray.

After moving to the village of Coaraze, in the Provence-Alpes-Côte d'Azur, he directed an experimental live-action, partially animated film also called Coaraze, which won the Prix Jean Vigo in 1965. In the late 1960s he began making his own personal fine art animation. He also made several documentaries on other artists.

Teaching career and CalArts
Back in the U.S., Engel continued working on films about artists, directing A Look at a Lithographer and American Sculpture of the Sixties for Tamarind Lithography Workshop, and a  film about the Swiss artist Max Bill.

In 1969, Engel became the Founding Director of CalArts' Animation Program; subsequently becoming the Founding Director of the Experimental Animation Department in the School of Film and Video. Engel's department became known for its animation teaching. CalArts, located Valencia, is the first higher education institution in America to offer a formal degree in animation.

In 1973, Engel self-published a collection of typographic art, entitled 'Oh'.

During the 23rd Annual Annie Awards, in 1995, he received the Winsor McCay Award for his lifetime contributions to the field of animation. He was also recipient of five Golden Eagle awards, the Fritz Award, the Norman McLaren Heritage Award, and the Pulcinella Award for Career Achievement.

Death
Engel died of natural causes on September 6, 2003 in Simi Valley California, at the age of 94 years old.

Legacy
In one of his final acts, in May 2003, Engel established the Jules Engel Endowed Scholarship Fund. The recipients of the awards are those students who have carried out their work at CalArts in Jules' name, having demonstrated rigor, daring imagination and great curiosity about the world, leading to inventive, interdisciplinary projects.

Engel was also a painter and produced a prolific body of oil abstract paintings, lithographs and other graphic artworks. During the late 40s and early 50s his works were exhibited at the Art Institute of Chicago, the Metropolitan Museum of Art, and the De Young Museum, and throughout his life he exhibited in more than sixty museums and galleries such as the Whitney Museum of American Art, the Los Angeles County Museum of Art, the Pennsylvania Academy of Fine Arts, and the Walker Art Center. He was still working on a new series of lithographs just before his death.

Many of his students carried out his influence through their work, including John Lasseter, Henry Selick, Tim Burton, Stephen Hillenburg, Joanna Priestley, Christine Panushka, Peter Chung, Glen Keane, Ellen Woodbury, Eric Darnell, Mark Osborne, Steven Subotnick, Patrice Stellest, and Mark Kirkland.

The Engel Animation Advancement Research Center (EAARC) offers a slate of animated shorts drawn from leading international festivals. The program is structured around the themes of personal struggle and forbidden desire in the context of a polarized, conflicted world.

In 2003, the Center for Visual Music, Los Angeles (CVM) and Cal Arts presented a major retrospective of Engel's films at Cal Arts' REDCAT Theatre. Both iotaCenter and CVM have preserved a number of Engel's films; CVM established the Jules Engel Preservation Project shortly after Jules' death. Engel's 1976 film Shapes and Gestures was preserved by the Academy Film Archive in 2001.

The SpongeBob SquarePants Movie, co-written and directed by Stephen Hillenburg (one of Engel's students), is dedicated to the loving memory of him.

References

External links 

 
 Jules Engel, Art conservation Archive
 Jules Engel Filmography at the IotaCenter
Interview of Jules Engel, part of an interview series at the Center for Oral History Research, UCLA Library Special Collections 
 Engel's artwork at the Art Institute of Chicago
Jules Engel's Life Story on Web of Stories

1909 births
2003 deaths
American animators
American animated film directors
American sculptors
American graphic designers
American set designers
Chouinard Art Institute alumni
Jewish American artists
United States Army Air Forces soldiers
First Motion Picture Unit personnel
United States Army personnel of World War II
Animation educators
Evanston Township High School alumni
Format Films
20th-century American Jews
21st-century American Jews